Tomislav Ćorić (born 17 November 1979) is a Croatian politician.

See also 
Cabinet of Andrej Plenković I
Cabinet of Andrej Plenković II

References 

Living people
1979 births
People from Metković
21st-century Croatian politicians
Government ministers of Croatia
Economy ministers of Croatia
Representatives in the modern Croatian Parliament
University of Zagreb alumni